Simone Assemani (February 19, 1752 – April 7, 1821), grand-nephew of Giuseppe Simone Assemani, was born in Rome.

He was professor of Oriental languages in Padua. He is best known by his masterly detection of the literary imposture of Giuseppe Vella, a Maltese priest, which claimed to be a history of the Saracens in Syria.

Major works

Numismatics
Museo Cufico Naniano / illustrato dall' Abate Simone Assemani. Padua 1787-88. Microfilm-Edition Urbana, Ill.: Univ. of Illinois 1998.
Sopra le Monete Arabe effigiate. Padua 1809.
Spiegazione di due rarissime medaglie cufiche della famiglia degli Ommiadi appartenenti al Museo Majnoni in Milano. Milan, 1818.

Orientalism
Saggio sull'origine culto letteratura e costumi degli Arabi avanti Maometto. Padua 1787.
 
Catalogo De'Codici Manoscritti Orientali Della Bibliotheca Naniana / Compilato Dall' Abate Simone Assemani Professore Di Lingue Oriental. Padua 1792.

References

 G. Levi Della Vida, «ASSEMANI, Simone». In: Dizionario biografico degli Italiani, vol. 4 (on-line)

1752 births
1820 deaths
18th-century Italian people
19th-century Italian people
Italian numismatists
Italian orientalists
Christian Hebraists
Italian Hebraists
Italian people of Lebanese descent